Jwan Hesso (born October 10, 1982 in Aleppo) is a Syrian footballer who plays for That Ras in the Jordan League .

International career
Hesso has been a regular for the Syria national football team since 2009. Senior national coach Fajr Ibrahim called him for the first time, and he debuted in a 5 June 2009 friendly against Sierra Leone. He came on as a substitute for Hamzeh Al Aitoni in the second halftime.

Appearances for Syrian national team
Results list Syria's goal tally first.

W = Matches won; D = Matches drawn; L = Matches lost

1 Non FIFA 'A' international match

Honour and Titles

Club
Al-Jaish
Syrian Premier League: 2009–10

National Team
Nehru Cup: 2009 Runner-up

References

External links
 Career stats at Kooora.com (Arabic)
 Career stats at goalzz.com

Living people
Sportspeople from Damascus
Syrian footballers
Syria international footballers
Association football defenders
Kurdish sportspeople
Al-Jaish Damascus players
Al-Shorta Damascus players
Syrian expatriate footballers
Expatriate footballers in Jordan
Syrian expatriate sportspeople in Jordan
Syrian Kurdish people
1982 births
Syrian Premier League players